Gabriel Leland (born September 28, 1982) is a convicted criminal and former Democratic politician from the state of Michigan.  In 2004, Leland was elected to the Michigan State House of Representatives, representing the 10th District, which is located in Wayne County and includes the farwest and partial northwest corner of the city of Detroit. Leland has served on the Detroit City Council from 2013 to 2021, when he resigned and pleaded guilty to misconduct in office.

Biography

Gabriel Leland was born on September 28, 1982 to Burton and Rosanne Leland, a Jewish family from Northwest Detroit.  At the time of his birth, his father was serving as Democratic State Representative, a position that he would hold until 1998, when he was elected to the Michigan State Senate where he served until he retired from the legislature due to term limits in 2006.  Gabe and his older brother Zachary spent much of their childhood working on the campaigns of their father, serving as voter registration drive workers and walking door-to-door with their father.

Leland attended both East Lansing and Detroit Public Schools and graduated from East Lansing High School in 2001. He attended Kehillat Israel Congregation in Lansing, MI while growing up.

Leland graduated from Central Michigan University with a B.S. / community development concentration.  He attends the Isaac Agree Downtown Synagogue in Detroit.

Political career
In 2004, following in the footsteps of his father, Gabe Leland announced his candidacy as a Democrat for the 10th State House District in Detroit to succeed Triette E. Reeves, who was retiring due to term limits. However, Leland faced much opposition in the Democratic Primary.  The 10th District is approximately 70% African American and several prominent African Americans ran against Leland in the primary, including future State Representative from the 9th District, Shanelle Jackson.  The primary was competitive and often racially charged. Leland narrowly won the Primary with only 21% of the vote.  He went on to easily win the General Election, as the 10th District is heavily Democratic.

In 2006, several people again challenged Leland in the Democratic Primary, including Stephanie Young, who was supported by former mayor Kwame Kilpatrick.  Leland won the primary with 53% of the vote.  He won the 2008 Democratic primary with 68% of the vote and no Republican ran against him in the 2008 General Election.  Term limits prevent Leland from running for re-election in 2010.

On November 5, 2013 Leland won the newly created Detroit City Council seat in District 7. It was the narrowest victory in any of the council races, winning by only 50 votes. In 2017, Leland was re-elected with 56% of the vote.

FBI Investigation
In July 2017, a Fox2 investigation revealed Gabe Leland has voted for, or extended, at least four contracts on behalf of Gasper Fiore. Fiore's daughter, Jennifer Fiore, has acknowledged that she dated Leland from late 2014 to early 2017. She is also an attorney and executive in Fiore's companies. The contracts, or amendments, are valued at over two million dollars.

In addition to providing towing services, Gasper Fiore was also an executive in companies that leased property to the Detroit Police Department and removed snow from Detroit streets.

Fiore was among twenty defendants targeted in a public corruption investigation in Macomb County that targeted pay-to-play schemes, including one that took down the Rizzo trash empire. In May 2017, a federal grand jury indicted Gasper Fiore on bribery and fraud charges for paying a Clinton Township trustee to support a towing contract for Fiore's companies.

In December 2017, the Detroit Free Press obtained wiretap transcripts that were accidentally unsealed in U.S. District Court. The transcripts were part of the FBI investigation against Gasper Fiore. According to court documents, the government had probable cause that Fiore and other targets, including Leland, were involved in several crimes, including: extortion, wire fraud, bribery and conspiracy to distribute marijuana.

On October 4, 2018, Leland was indicted on charges of two counts of bribery and one count of conspiracy to commit bribery. The charges stemmed from Leland's solicitation of bribes from local business owner Robert Carmack, in exchange for Leland's help in preventing or delaying the city's sale of a property Carmack owned. According to Lawrence Garcia, of the City of Detroit Corporation Counsel, "Leland promised not to sell Carmack's property, located at 8124 Michigan Ave., if Carmack would give Leland $15,000 for his reelection campaign."  Carmack also claims Leland asked him to fix his secretary’s car for free.

The indictment details several discussions Leland had with Carmack between May and August 2017, including a meeting at the Caucus Club, where Leland acknowledged receiving $7,500 cash. At a May 2017 meeting, Leland told Carmack: "I should ask for 30 (thousand dollars) but I'm nice to you."

After the request by Leland, Carmack went to the FBI for help who asked Carmack to wear a wire and pay Leland. While a camera was secretly recording, Carmack paid $7,500 to Leland campaign staffer, Elisa Grubbs. Leland allegedly confirmed the payment on tape.

The indictment alleges that after Leland and Carmack discussed preventing the sale in exchange for $15,000, Leland cast the only vote during a June 2017 council committee meeting against placing the property sale on the City Council agenda. At the time of the vote, Leland was chairman of the committee. Later, the indictment says, Leland discussed his ability to hold up the property sale during a telephone conversation with Carmack. "I held it up again. Yeah. Yeah, it stayed right, right in committee brother." Later in the conversation, Leland scolded Carmack: "You didn't show up to my fundraiser."

According to the indictment, Carmack was uncomfortable about his dealings with Leland. Leland reassured Carmack of his loyalty, stating: "No, but you can f---in' trust me. That's all that matters."

In spite of Carmack’s attempts to curry favor, Leland eventually put Carmack’s property on the city council agenda to sell it.

The indictment also accuses Leland of conspiring with Grubbs, who was charged for her role in the alleged scheme.

If convicted of the charges, Leland faces up to 10 years in prison and a $250,000 fine on each bribery count and up to five years and a $250,000 fine on the conspiracy count.

Extortion lawsuit
In March 2018, Robert Carmack filed a lawsuit against Leland in federal court for extortion.

Electoral history

 2017 campaign for Detroit City Council District 7
 Gabe Leland, 56%
 Regina Ross, 44%
 2013 campaign for Detroit City Council District 7
 Gabe Leland, 49.11%
 John K. Bennett, 48.81%
2008 campaign for State House
Gabe Leland (D), 95%
Marc Sosnowski (UST), 5%
2008 campaign for State House, Democratic Primary
Gabe Leland (D), 68%
LaTanya Garrett (D), 27%
Brian Sylvester (D), 6%
2006 campaign for State House
Gabe Leland (D), 94%
Thomas Shaut (R), 6%
2006 campaign for State House, Democratic Primary
Gabe Leland (D), 53%
Stephanie Young (D), 28%
Barbra Long (D), 8%
Ron Johnson (D), 4%
Thomas Jackson (D), 3%
2004 campaign for State House
Gabe Leland (D), 91%
Reuben Myers (R), 9%
2004 campaign for State House, Democratic Primary
Gabe Leland (D), 21%
Jim Edmondson, Jr. (D), 18%
Barbra Long (D), 17%
Shanelle Jackson (D), 17%
Carolyn Chambers (D), 10%
Ron Johnson (D), 6%
Michael Grundy (D), 5%

References

External links

Project Vote Smart

Living people
Democratic Party members of the Michigan House of Representatives
Detroit City Council members
County commissioners in Michigan
Central Michigan University alumni
Jewish American state legislators in Michigan
1982 births
21st-century American politicians
Michigan politicians convicted of crimes
21st-century American Jews
Michigan Democrats
Criminals from Michigan
American male criminals
21st-century American criminals
Political scandals in the United States
Politicians from Detroit
Political controversies in the United States